Ginostra is 2002 crime fiction film written and directed by Manuel Pradal, starring Harvey Keitel (Matt Benson), Andie MacDowell (Jessie). The story is about an FBI officer (Harvey Keitel) investigating the murder of a would-be informant, attempts to contact the only person who knows the truth behind the killings - the dead man's eleven-year-old son.

Plot
As the film opens, we learn that Benson, a New Yorker, has been entrusted with protecting the 11-year-old boy. The style of the film is intentionally ambiguous, and details about only obtained through the dialogue between the main characters, in many cases, in a way that only makes sense once later scenes are viewed. The boy, as is revealed later, is with Benson because his father had appealed for protection from the authorities in return for his testimony against a local mobster, Manzella. The title of the film refers to the location of the main characters, who live on an island that is remote enough from the mainland that fresh water must be shipped in. Also on the island is a mysterious convent of nuns who make a living producing what appears to be wine and food seasonings, mainly using the local plants. The convent is located high in the mountains, and takes its heat from the active volcano on the island.

Benson finds that his efforts to get the child to talk to him about the murder of his father, who was to be under protection at the time that he was killed (the plot does not reveal when the killing took place) are frustrated by the boy's strong desire to exact his own revenge. From the actions of Manzella and others, it becomes apparent that the boy was either present when his father was killed, or knows details relevant to the murder. Much of the story revolves around a cat-and-mouse style chase between Manzella and the boy. All the while, Benson must deal with the local police, who have themselves been infiltrated by Manzella's organization (this, we learn, was how the boy's father was betrayed).

Romantic tension in the story is provided by Andie MacDowell's character, Jessie. She has come to stay on the island with Benson, and their young daughter. Because of the secretive nature of the case, however, there is very little that Benson can reveal to Jessie about their reason for being in Italy, and this begins to place a strain on their marriage. Jessie regards the boy as her own, and attempts to find things to occupy his time while her husband and the local police are  investigating Manzella. About midway through the story, we learn from the local detective, Giovanni Gigli, that the authorities are powerless to arrest Manzella, because he has the sympathy of those in the community of Naples, and it would be too dangerous to simply arrive in daylight with a warrant.

Cast
 Harvey Keitel as Matt Benson 
 Andie MacDowell as Jessie Benson 
 Francesca Neri as Helena Gigli 
 Harry Dean Stanton as Del Piero 
 Asia Argento as Nun
 Mattia De Martino as Ettore Greco 
 Stefano Dionisi as Giovanni Gigli 
 Luigi Maria Burruano as Uncle of Ettore  
 Violante Placido as Nurse
 Veronica Lazar as Susanna Del Piero 
 Angela Goodwin as Mother Superior
 Marino Masé as Night Watchman

Production
Filming for Ginostra took place in Italy during December 2000.

References

External links
Official website

2002 action thriller films
2002 crime thriller films
2002 films
Films directed by Manuel Pradal
2000s English-language films